Coatbridge and Chryston may refer to::

 Coatbridge and Chryston (UK Parliament constituency)
 Coatbridge and Chryston (Scottish Parliament constituency)